Abi Eniola is an English former television actress. She had been acting since 1993. She is renowned for her roles in Grange Hill (2000), Little Britain (2003–2004), and The Bill (2008).

Filmography

Television

External links 
 

20th-century English actresses
20th-century English people
20th-century English women
21st-century English actresses
21st-century English women
Alumni of Middlesex University
Actresses from Birmingham, West Midlands
Black British actresses
English people of Jamaican descent
English television actresses
Living people
People from Birmingham, West Midlands
Year of birth missing (living people)